The Shrawangai Nazarkhel  airstrike (February 12, 2009) was a military airstrike by the United States against Islamic terrorists in the Waziristan province of Pakistan.

See also 
 Laghman airstrikes - January 2009

References 

Airstrikes of the insurgency in Khyber Pakhtunkhwa
2009 in Pakistan
February 2009 events in Asia
2009 in military history